Mihrab (also referred to as Mihrap) is a 1901 painting by Turkish painter Osman Hamdi Bey.

Description 
The painting depicts a woman wearing a bright yellow decollete dress and sitting on a Qur'an lectern. Behind the woman is a tiled mihrab (a niche indicating the direction of the Kaaba in Mecca). On the floor at her feet are several large religious books strewn around. There is an incense burner in the painting's foreground. The female figure is based on the painter's wife.

Analysis 

The woman is sitting in the Rehal, where the Qur'an is usually placed; she has displaced the Qur'an and is now herself the focus of attention in this painting. The move to a more secular focus is shown by the woman's European dress which contrasts greatly with what would be expected in a mosque.

This painting, like other paintings by Osman Hamdi Bey, comments on the museum culture of his time. All of the items which we see surrounding the woman were part of the Ottoman Imperial Museum's collections. The museum collected religious items but by doing so secularised them, making them into objects which are valued for their aesthetic rather than religious qualities.

The painting has also been seen as blasphemic and anti-Islam, as the woman is trampling over religious books and sitting where the Qur'an should be; as Edhem Eldem says: "it is probably more difficult to imagine a more offensive way of attacking the very foundations of Islamic tradition in the name of promoting female independence and autonomy."

References

Sources 

Paintings by Osman Hamdi Bey
1901 paintings